DeWitt Township is one of thirteen townships in DeWitt County, Illinois, USA.  As of the 2010 census, its population was 479 and it contained 215 housing units.  It was renamed from its original name of Marion Township on June 7, 1859.

Geography

Cities, towns, villages
 DeWitt

Unincorporated towns
 Fullerton at 
 Parnell at 
(This list is based on USGS data and may include former settlements.)

Cemeteries
The township contains these three cemeteries: Barnes, DeWitt and McCord.

School districts
 Blue Ridge Community Unit School District 18
 Clinton Community Unit School District 15
 Deland-Weldon Community Unit School District 57

Political districts
 Illinois's 15th congressional district
 State House District 110
 State House District 87
 State Senate District 44
 State Senate District 55

References
 
 United States Census Bureau 2009 TIGER/Line Shapefiles
 United States National Atlas

External links
 City-Data.com
 Illinois State Archives
 Township Officials of Illinois

Townships in DeWitt County, Illinois
1858 establishments in Illinois
Populated places established in 1858
Townships in Illinois